The Chinese Korean language is the variety of the Korean language spoken by Koreans in China, primarily located in Heilongjiang, Jilin, and Liaoning.

All varieties of Korean except the Jeju language are spoken by members of the Korean diaspora who settled in China before 1949. The educational standard is the North Korean standard language.

Background

Language standardization
The text used in the Korean language of Yanbian was originally in Korean mixed script, which made it difficult for a large number of grassroots Korean people to read articles. In 1949, the local newspaper Northeast Korean People's Daily in Yanbian published the "workers and peasants version" which used all-hangul in text, in addition to the existing "cadre version" that had mixed script for the convenience of grassroots Korean people. Starting April 20, 1952, the newspaper abolished the "cadre version" and published in hangul only, soon the entire publishing industry adopted the hangul-only style. On June 28, 1963, Zhou Enlai instructed that the Korean language of Yanbian should be based on the Pyongyang standard of North Korea. Subsequently, the Yanbian Language and History Research Committee standardized the Korean language of Yanbian on the basis of North Korean standard.  Currently, the standardized dialect of Korean amongst Chinese-Koreans is similar to that of North Korea due to China's favorable relations with North Korea, and also the proximity of the two nations.

Regional variations
Yanbian Koreans primarily use Hamgyŏng dialect. Pyong'an dialect is spoken by ethnic Korean communities in Liaoning, while Kyŏngsang dialect is spoken in Heilongjiang.

Characteristics

Phonetics

Additionally, in the northeast and the southeast regions of this dialect, pitch accent is used.

Chinese Korean also simplifies diphthongs in loanwords into single vowels, such as in the word 땐노 (ddaen-no, "computer"; from Chinese 电脑, diànnăo).

Grammar
The copula "-ᆸ니까/-습니까" in Standard Korean is rendered as "-ᆷ둥/-슴둥" in dialects of Korean spoken in Northeastern Jilin, and "-ᆷ니꺼/-심니꺼" in dialects spoken in Southwestern Heilongjiang.

At the same time, there are grammatical influences from Standard Chinese, for example:
전화 치다 "make a phone call" (Standard Korean: 전화 걸다). In Chinese, the same sentence 打电话 literally means to physically "hit" a telephone, hence the word 치다, "to hit", is used to describe making a phone call.
뭘 주면 뭘 먹는다 "eat whatever is given" (Standard Korean: 주는 건 다 먹는다)

Vocabulary
As a result of Chinese influence, there are many words that arise from Modern Standard Chinese.

There are also some loanwords that are phonetically transliterated from Japanese that standard Korean doesn't have (probably due to influence of Manchukuo's rule):

References 

 
 
 

 
China